Italy competed at the 1998 Winter Paralympics in Nagano, Japan. 21 competitors from Italy won 10 medals including 3 gold, 4 silver and 3 bronze and finished 12th in the medal table.

See also 
 Italy at the Paralympics
 Italy at the 1998 Winter Olympics

References 

1998
1998 in Italian sport
Nations at the 1998 Winter Paralympics